Curation may refer to:

Activities
 Algorithmic curation, curation using computer algorithms
 Content curation, the collection and sorting of information
 Data curation, management activities required to maintain research data
 Digital curation, the preservation and maintenance of digital assets
 Evidence management, the indexing and cataloguing of evidence related to an event
 Cultural heritage management, conservation of cultural sites and resources

People who perform curation
 Curator, manager or interpreter, traditionally of tangible assets of a library or museum
 Biocurator, professional scientist who maintains information for biological databases

See also
 Curate, office and person holding it
 Archive, an accumulation of historical records